is a Japanese manga series created by Suihō Tagawa, originally published by Kodansha in Shōnen Kurabu, and one of the first series' to be reprinted in tankōbon format. The titular protagonist, Norakuro, or Norakuro-kun, is an anthropomorphic black and white dog inspired by Felix the Cat.

History

The strip's publication began in Kodansha's Shōnen Kurabu in 1931, and was based on the Imperial Japanese Army of the time; the manga artist, Suihō Tagawa, had served in the Imperial Army from 1919 to 1922. Norakuro was gradually promoted from private to captain in the stories, which began as humorous episodes, but eventually developed into propaganda tales of military exploits against the "pigs army" on the "continent" - a thinly-veiled reference to the Second Sino-Japanese War.

Serialization of Norakuro stopped in 1941 for wartime austerity reasons. After the war, due to the popularity of the strip, the character returned in various guises, including a sumo wrestler and a botanist.

Pre-war animated films based on the military Norakuro, and two post-war animated series of Norakuro, in 1970 and 1987, have also been produced. In the 1970 series, the voice of Norakuro was played by Nobuyo Ōyama, also known as the voice of Doraemon. During the 1980s and early 1990s, Norakuro was the mascot of the Physical Training School (Tai-Iku Gakko) of the Japan Self-Defense Forces.

There is an excerpt that appears in the sixth Kramer's Ergot  comics anthology which is the only example of Tagawa's work published in English.

References

External links
 Norakuro-kun at Studio Pierrot
 Norakuro-kun at Studio Pierrot 
 
 
 

1930s animated short films
1931 manga
1981 comics endings
1933 anime films
1933 films
1934 anime films
1934 films
1935 anime films
1935 films
1938 anime films
1938 films
1970 anime television series debuts
1971 Japanese television series endings
1987 anime television series debuts
1988 Japanese television series endings
Animated television series about dogs
Anime series based on manga
Anime short films
Comics characters introduced in 1931
Eiken (studio)
Fuji TV original programming
Kodansha manga
Manga adapted into films
Pierrot (company)
Shōnen manga